Joseph Frans Lescrauwaet, M.S.C.  (19 June 1923 – 19 November 2013) was a Dutch prelate of the Catholic Church.

Lescrauwaet was born in Amsterdam, Netherlands and was ordained a priest on 12 September 1948 from religious order of Missionaries of the Sacred Heart of Jesus. Lescrauwaet was appointed auxiliary bishop of Diocese of Haarlem on 19 October 1983 as well as Titular Bishop of Turres Concordiae and was ordained bishop on 14 January 1984. Lescrauwaet resigned as auxiliary bishop of Haarlem on 22 March 1995.

External links
 Catholic-Hierarchy.org
Diocese of Haarlem-Amsterdam (Dutch)

1923 births
2013 deaths
20th-century Roman Catholic bishops in the Netherlands
Clergy from Amsterdam
20th-century Roman Catholic titular bishops